In telecommunication, attack time is the time between the instant that a signal at the input of a device or circuit exceeds the activation threshold of the device or circuit and the instant that the device or circuit reacts in a specified manner, or to a specified degree, to the input.  Attack time occurs in devices such as clippers, peak limiters, compressors, and voxes.

See also
Transmitter attack-time delay
Federal Standard 1037C
Fall time
Overshoot (signal)
ADSR envelope

References

Telecommunication theory
Audio engineering